The 2002–03 season was the 46th season in RK Zamet’s history. It is their 2nd successive season in the 1.HRL, and 26th successive top tier season.

First team squad

Goalkeeper
1   Nikola Blažičko
 12  Ivan Stevanović
 16  Igor Saršon
 20   Vedran Šimunović

Wingers
RW
 3  Tadej Široka
 8  Boris Batinić

LW
 4  Mateo Hrvatin
 15  Janko Mavrović
 19  Ivan Pongračić 

Line players
 2  Damir Bogdanović
 11  Mirjan Horvat
 14  Dalibor Zupčić

Back players
LB
 10  Robert Savković
 14  Tino Černjul
 17  Zlatko Saračević (retired at end of December)

CB
 17  Vladimir Ostarčević
 18  Marko Bagarić 
RB

 5  Davor Šunjić
 7  Milan Uzelac (captain)
 13  Vedran Banić

Technical staff
  President: Miljenko Mišljenović 
  Sports director: Damir Bogdanović (director-player)
  Marketing director: Zlatko Saračević
  Club Secretary: Daniela Juriša
  Head Coach: Damir Čavlović (until 27 February 2003)
  Head Coach: Zlatko Saračević (from 27 February 2003)
  Assistant Coach: Sergio DePrivitellio 
  Fizioterapist: Marinko Anić
  Tehniko: Marin Miculinić

Competitions

Overall

EHF Cup

Matches

1. HRL

League table

Matches

Croatian Cup

Matches

External links
HRS
Sport.net.hr
Rk-zamet.hr

References

RK Zamet seasons
Handball in Croatia